Gemboyah is a village in Linge district, Central Aceh Regency in Aceh province, Indonesia. Its population is 917.

Climate
Gemboyah has a subtropical highland climate (Cfb) with moderate to heavy rainfall year-round.

References

 Populated places in Aceh